Bholi Bano is a 2017 Pakistani drama serial directed by Furqan Adam, produced by Mastermind Production and written by Samra Bukhari. It stars newcomer Hiba Bukhari and Syed Jibran as Female and Male lead respectively.

Plot
The story of the serial is based upon a simple and innocent girl Bano who lives with her Nani and Mamu as her parents had died. Life changes for Bano when a landholder from internal Sindh, Tajdaar , falls in love with her. Bano was unaware of his love. Soon after Bano was married to her relatives son, Soban. There she faced hatred of Soban's step-mother and step-sister. She tries to find refuge in Soban but he is not courageous enough to fight for her and that's where Tajdaar steps in to help her but Bano, being a faithful girl, does not want any help from him.

Cast
Hiba Bukhari as Bano
Syed Jibran as Tajdaar
Arez Ahmed as Soban
Namrah Shahid as Zeenia
Humaira Bano as Zeenia's mother
Samina Ahmed as Nani
Farah Nadir as Bano's aunt
Abdullah Kadwani
Sajida Syed as Kulsoom
Waseem Abbas as Asghar
Imran Bukhari as Abid
Hajra Yamin as Shela
Kanwar Arsalan as Kaif
Zuhab Khan as Tipu

Production
The serial was filmed in various areas of Sindh, including Mirpur Khas, Hyderabad, Karachi and also in some internal villages of Sindh.

Released
The drama was premiered on 27 February 2017 on Monday and Tuesday at 9:00 twice a week.
It was one of the top rated and most watched serials of 2017. After the end of Khaali Haath its timing changed to Mondays at 8:00 P.m.

References

2017 Pakistani television series debuts
Geo TV original programming
Pakistani drama television series
Urdu-language television shows